Karl-Johan Gustavsson (born 21 July 1958) is a Swedish wrestler. He competed in two events at the 1984 Summer Olympics.

References

External links
 

1958 births
Living people
Swedish male sport wrestlers
Olympic wrestlers of Sweden
Wrestlers at the 1984 Summer Olympics
People from Lidköping Municipality
Sportspeople from Västra Götaland County
20th-century Swedish people